"Koishikute" is the 11th Uverworld single, released on 10 September 2008. Despite being freestanding, the song peaked at #3, selling 52,000 copies in its first week. Overall, it has sold 68,000 copies. The song was their highest selling freestanding single until they released "7th Trigger" in 2012.

Track listing

CD 
 
 
 "over the stoic"

DVD 
 Just Break the Limit! (limited edition)
 Uverworld Trailer

Personnel 
 TAKUYA∞ - vocals, rap, programming
 Katsuya - guitar, programming
 Akira - guitar, programming
 Nobuto - bass guitar
 Shintarou - drums

References

Uverworld songs
2008 singles
2008 songs
Gr8! Records singles